Roland Willoughby (6 September 1870 – 15 February 1954) was a British fencer. He competed at the 1920 and 1924 Summer Olympics. In 1914, he won the foil title at the British Fencing Championships.

References

1870 births
1954 deaths
British male fencers
Olympic fencers of Great Britain
Fencers at the 1920 Summer Olympics
Fencers at the 1924 Summer Olympics